Anzio order of battle is a listing of the significant formations that were involved in the fighting for the Anzio bridgehead south of Rome, January 1944 – June 1944

Allied Forces and organization

Allied Armies in Italy
C-in-C: General Sir Harold Alexander

US Fifth Army
Commander:
Lieutenant-General Mark Wayne Clark

US VI Corps 

Major-General John P. Lucas (until February 23)
Major-General Lucian K. Truscott (from February 23)
Deputy commander: Major-General Lucian K.Truscottt (from 16 February to February 23)
Deputy commander: Major-General Vyvyan Evelegh (from 16 February to 18 March)

 3rd Infantry Division (Major-General Lucian K. Truscott until February 23 then Brigadier John W. O'Daniel) until 25 May 1944
 British 1st Infantry Division (Major-General Ronald Penney)
 45th Infantry Division (Major-General William W. Eagles)
 1st Armored Division (Major-General Ernest N. Harmon)
 British 56th Infantry Division (Major-General Gerald Templer) (from mid- February 1944 until mid-March 1944)
 34th Infantry Division (Major-General Charles W. Ryder) (from March 1944)
 36th Infantry Division (Major-General Fred L. Walker) (from April 1944)
 British 5th Infantry Division (Major-General Philip Gregson-Ellis) (from March 1944)

  US-Canadian First Special Service Force (3 regiments; from early February)
 6615th Ranger Force (1st, 3rd and 4th battalions, 83rd Chemical Battalion and U.S. 509th Parachute Infantry Battalion)
 504th Parachute Infantry Regiment
 British 2nd Special Service Brigade (9 and 43 British Commandos)

U.S. II Corps (from 25 May 1944)
Major-General Geoffrey Keyes
 88th Infantry Division (Major-General John E. Sloan)
 85th Infantry Division (Major-General John B. Coulter)
 3rd Infantry Division (Brigadier John W. O'Daniel)

Axis forces and organization

Army Group C
Commander:
Generalfeldmarschall Albert Kesselring

German Fourteenth Army
Commander: General Eberhard von Mackensen (until end May 1944, then under direct command of Kesselring)

I Parachute Corps
General Alfred Schlemm
4th Parachute Division (Major-General Heinrich Trettner)
"Nembo" Battalion from RSI Parachute Regiment "Folgore" (Italian Social Republic) (Captain Corradino Alvino)
29th Panzergrenadier Division (Lieutenant-General Walter Fries)
65th Infantry Division (Major-General Hellmuth Pfeifer)
715th Infantry Division (Major-General Hans-Georg Hildebrandt)
"Barbarigo" Battalion from Decima Flottiglia MAS (Italian Social Republic) (Captain Umberto Bardelli)
114th Jäger Division (Lieutenant-General Karl Eglseer)

German LXXVI Panzer Corps
General Traugott Herr
3rd Panzergrenadier Division (Lieutenant-General Fritz-Hubert Gräser)
26th Panzer Division (Lieutenant-General Smilo Freiherr von Lüttwitz)
Hermann Göring Panzer Division (Major-General Paul Conrath)
362nd Infantry Division (Major-General Heinz Greiner)
71st Infantry Division (Lieutenant-General Wilhelm Raapke)

Notes

Sources
 
 
 
 

World War II orders of battle
Italian campaign (World War II)
1944 in Italy